Abbas I may refer to:
 Abbas the Great (1571–1629), Shah of Persia
 Abbas I of Egypt (1812–1854), Wāli and unrecognised Khedive of Egypt and Sudan

See also
Abbas (name)